Unity was an English association football club from Blackheath, founded in 1875.  The club was the works side of the William Tarn & Co department store in Elephant & Castle, and the club's three secretaries all give the store's address (165 Newington Causeway) as the club's correspondence address.

The club's first recorded match was in November 1876 against Prairie Rangers.   Unity was originally of little account; in 1877 it claimed to have won only one match the previous season and only scored two goals.  However, in the 1877–78 season it won 8 and drew 8 of its 20 matches, scoring 14 and conceding 11.

Possibly as a result of this improvement the club entered the FA Cup in 1878-79.  However, having been drawn to play the Remnants club, Unity withdrew.

It was the club's only FA Cup entry, even though the club remained members of the Football Association until 1883, and active until as late as 1888, when the club played Luton Town on Boxing Day.

Colours

The club played in navy blue and cerise.

References

Association football clubs established in 1875
Defunct football clubs in England
1875 establishments in England
Association football clubs established in the 19th century